is a Japan-exclusive soccer video game for the Family Computer, which was released in 1990.

References

1990 video games
Association football video games
Japan-exclusive video games
Nintendo Entertainment System games
Nintendo Entertainment System-only games
Tokuma Shoten games
Multiplayer and single-player video games
Video games developed in Japan